The 1953–1954 St. Francis Terriers men's basketball team represented St. Francis College during the 1953–54 NCAA Division I men's basketball season. The team was coached by Daniel Lynch, who was in his sixth year at the helm of the St. Francis Terriers. The team was a member of the Metropolitan New York Conference and played their home games at the Bulter Street Gymnasium in their Cobble Hill, Brooklyn campus and at the II Corps Artillery Armory in Park Slope, Brooklyn.

During the 1953–54 season the Terriers won their first regular season conference championship and participated in their first National Invitational Tournament reaching the Quarterfinals. Their participation in the NIT was more impressive considering they had the smallest student body of all schools ever selected and were the only school participating from the NYC area that year. The Terries first round victory over 20th ranked Louisville was considered a notable upset. The 1953–54 season also stands as the Terriers best record of all-time.

Roster

Schedule

|-
!colspan=12 style="background:#0038A8; border: 2px solid #CE1126;;color:#FFFFFF;"| Exhibition 

 

|-
!colspan=12 style="background:#0038A8; border: 2px solid #CE1126;;color:#FFFFFF;"| Regular Season

     
    
     
  

  

 

       

  

 
  
  
   
  
|-
!colspan=5 style="background:#0038A8; border: 2px solid #CE1126;;color:#FFFFFF;"|National Invitation Tournament

NIT results
Below is the tournament bracket.

NBA Draft

At the end of the season Henry Daubenschmidt was drafted by the Boston Celtics with the 23rd overall pick.

Awards

Henry Daubenschmidt

 All-Metropolitan player by the Metropolitan Basketball Writers’ Association

References

External links
 St. Francis Terriers men's basketball official website

St. Francis Brooklyn Terriers men's basketball seasons
St. Francis
St. Francis
Saint Francis
Saint Francis